John Carfield Sanborn (September 28, 1885 – May 16, 1968), Idaho) was a congressman from southern Idaho. Sanborn served as a Republican in the House for two terms, from 1947 to 1951.

Born in Chenoa, Illinois, Sanborn was the son of Orville D. Sanborn and Frances (Carfield) Sanborn. He graduated from Oberlin College in Ohio in 1908 and the Columbia Law School in New York City in 1912.

Sanborn moved west and engaged in agricultural pursuits in Hagerman, Idaho. He was a trustee of the local school district and served in both houses of the state legislature: house (1921–1929) and senate (1939–1941). Following World War II, he ran for Congress and was elected to the open seat in the state's 2nd district in 1946 and re-elected in 1948. He was a candidate for the United States Senate in 1950 and 1956 but was defeated both times in the Republican primary by Herman Welker. He also entered the 1954 gubernatorial primary, won by Robert Smylie. At age 76, he ran for the 2nd district seat again in 1962, but lost a runoff in the GOP primary to Orval Hansen.

A Methodist, Sanborn was the last non-Mormon to represent Idaho's 2nd district in Congress. The successor to his open seat, Republican Hamer H. Budge, was the first Mormon to represent Idaho in either house of Congress. For 35 consecutive elections, 1950 through 2020, the 2nd district winner has been a member of the Church of Jesus Christ of Latter-day Saints.

Sanborn died in Boise in 1968 at age 82 and was buried in Hagerman.

References

External links

Political Graveyard – Sanborn

Columbia Law School alumni
People from Boise, Idaho
Methodists from Idaho
1885 births
1968 deaths
Republican Party members of the United States House of Representatives from Idaho
20th-century American politicians
People from Chenoa, Illinois